The Mozambique women's national basketball team is the nationally controlled basketball team representing Mozambique at world basketball competitions for women.

Competition record

FIBA World Championship
2014 – 15th

FIBA Africa Championship
1983 – 4th
1984 – 5th
1986 – 2nd
1990 – 3rd
1993 – 3rd
1994 – 4th
2000 – 6th
2003 – 2nd
2005 – 3rd
2007 – 4th
2009 – 6th
2011 – 5th
2013 – 2nd
2015 – 6th
2017 – 4th
2019 – 4th
2021 – 5th
2023 – Qualified

Current roster
Roster for the 2021 Women's Afrobasket.

References

External links
FIBA profile

Women's team
Women's national basketball teams
B